Annawan Township is one of twenty-four townships in Henry County, Illinois, USA.  As of the 2010 census, its population was 1,112 and it contained 515 housing units.

Geography

Cities, towns, villages
 Annawan (vast majority)

Adjacent townships
 Alba Township (north)
 Gold Township, Bureau County (northeast)
 Mineral Township, Bureau County (east)
 Neponset Township, Bureau County (southeast)
 Kewanee Township (south)
 Burns Township (southwest)
 Cornwall Township (west)
 Atkinson Township (northwest)

Major highways
  Interstate 80
  U.S. Route 6
  Illinois Route 78

Landmarks
 Hennepin Canal Parkway State Park (east edge)
 Johnson Sauk Trail State Park (north half)

Demographics

School districts
 Annawan Community Unit School District 226
 Kewanee Community Unit School District 229

Political districts
 Illinois's 14th congressional district
 State House District 74
 State Senate District 37

References
 
 United States Census Bureau 2008 TIGER/Line Shapefiles
 United States National Atlas

External links
 City-Data.com
 Illinois State Archives
 Township Officials of Illinois

Townships in Henry County, Illinois
Townships in Illinois